The Hiawatha Traditional Music Festival is a music festival held each year in Marquette, Michigan during the next-to-last full weekend of July and features traditional, acoustic and American music. Each year's main-stage line-up can include bluegrass, old-time, Cajun, Celtic, acoustic blues, Gospel, etc. The line-up includes national, regional and local performers, and singers/songwriters are always featured. The Festival also includes music and activities designed for teens and children. An arts and crafts show sponsored by a local art organization is held in conjunction with the Festival. Many of the arts and crafts vendors sell environment-friendly items. The Hiawatha Festival began in 1979 in Champion, Michigan. Since 1984, the Festival has been held at the Marquette Tourist Park.

Camping is available on-site for everyone going to the festivals. The Hiawatha Music Festival is conducted by the Hiawatha Music N-n Profit Corporation, 501(c)3 non-profit commonly known as the Hiawatha Music Co-op.

The Hiawatha Music Festival is located in Tourist Park, a campground along the Dead River. It is a great location for the festival and more than accommodates all campers to bathrooms with showers, a green field for activities, and a lake with a beach.

The music festival requires a year-round effort of many volunteers to keep it going. This group still includes several of the original founders.

Each year's Festival includes a variety of licensed, contracted food concessionaires, as well as a juried arts and crafts show.  There is a token system much like most festivals that people can purchase in the same area as the vendors. Musicians also use this vendor area to promote or sell their CDs and DVDs.  In addition, there are activities and performances for young children, tweens and teenagers. Workshops for adults run all day on Saturday and Sunday.

Camping in the park is a very great experience during the festival. There are quiet sections for families, a section for youths to commune and camp, and the rising favorite 'A' section where the musicians normally stay. Even after midnight when the main stage has seen its last act, the musicians and bands will mix and congregate to play music all throughout the night. This is a great way for amateurs to even step in and show what they've got. Fire pits are available for warmth and light and are usable from start to end.

Hiawatha and local authorities work to keep the festival a safe for all with a combination of experienced security volunteers, paid security and City officers.

There'll be no festival in 2020 as the COVID-19 pandemic was to blame; the 42nd is deferred to 2021.

References

External links
http://hiawathamusic.org

Music festivals in Michigan
Tourist attractions in Marquette County, Michigan